Orphan of the Sage is a 1928 American silent Western film directed by Louis King and starring Buzz Barton, Frank Rice and Thomas G. Lingham.

Cast
 Buzz Barton as David 'Red' Hepner 
 Frank Rice as Hank Robbins 
 Thomas G. Lingham as Jeff Perkins 
 Annabelle Magnus as Mary Jane Perkins 
 Bill Patton as 'Nevada' Naldene

References

Bibliography
 Langman, Larry. A Guide to Silent Westerns. Greenwood Publishing Group, 1992.

External links
 

1928 films
1928 Western (genre) films
1920s English-language films
American black-and-white films
Films directed by Louis King
Film Booking Offices of America films
Silent American Western (genre) films
1920s American films